The Handball Federation Singapore (HFS) is the administrative and controlling body for handball and beach handball in Republic of Singapore. Founded in 2008, HFS is a member of Asian Handball Federation (AHF) and the International Handball Federation (IHF).

National teams
 Singapore men's national handball team
 Singapore women's national handball team
 Singapore national beach handball team
 Singapore women's national beach handball team

References

External links
 Official website  
 Singapore at the IHF website.
 Singapore at the AHF website.

Handball in Singapore
Handball
Sports organizations established in 2008
2008 establishments in Singapore
Handball governing bodies
Asian Handball Federation
National members of the International Handball Federation
Organisations based in Singapore